Zacharie Tshimanga Wa Tshibangu was a Congolese historian and writer and co-founder of the SOHIZA in 1974.

Biography
Zacharie Tshimanga Wa Tshibangu was born October 4, 1941, in Musefu.

Works
Tshimanga Wa Tshibangu published the following works:

Book illustration

Books

Essays
  Histoire du Zaire Editions Ceruki, 1976
  Enseignement en République du Zaire Editions BASE, 1986

Articles
  Léopold II face à la France au sujet de la création des droits d'entrée dans le bassin conventionnel du Congo: 1890 et 1892. In "Études d'histoire africaine"  page 169-203, 1974 Kinshasa, Éditions UNAZA-PUZ

References

External links

 David Northup talking of Tshimanga Wa Tshibangu in his book "End of Slavery in Africa" Page 462
 Culture Française Magazine dealing with Zacharie Tshimanga works Page 43

1941 births
1985 deaths
Democratic Republic of the Congo pan-Africanists
Democratic Republic of the Congo Africanists
Writers about Africa
Democratic Republic of the Congo non-fiction writers
Democratic Republic of the Congo historians
20th-century historians
University of Toulouse-Jean Jaurès alumni
Historians of the Democratic Republic of the Congo